The Italian Animalist Party (Partito Animalista Italiano) is a political party in Italy focused animal rights. It was founded on 4, July 2006 and is led by Cristiano Ceriello.

History
The Italian Animalist Party was founded in 2006 by lawyer and animal rights activist Cristiano Ceriello. The main objectives of the Italian Animalist Party are animal liberation and climate change activism. In 2019, the Italian Animalist Party participated in the 2019 European Parliament election, obtaining 0.6% at the national level, making it the tenth Italian political party by number of seats held.

In 2020, the party organized food collections for animals during the COVID-19 pandemic in Italy and presented a petition to the president of the province of Trento and to the Prefect and the Minister of the Environment asking for the release of the M49 bear.

Electoral results

Italian Parliament

European Parliament

Regional elections

Symbols

References

Single-issue parties in Italy
Political parties established in 2006
2006 establishments in Italy
Animal advocacy parties